Ziguinchor is a region of Senegal (regional capitals have the same name as their respective regions).  The region is also referred to historically and popularly as Basse Casamance.

Departments
Ziguinchor region is divided into 3 departments:
Bignona Département
Oussouye Département
Ziguinchor Département

References

 
Casamance
Regions of Senegal